The International Skating Union (ISU) is the international governing body for competitive ice skating disciplines, including figure skating, synchronized skating, speed skating, and short track speed skating. It was founded in Scheveningen, Netherlands, in July 1892, making it one of the oldest international sport federations. The ISU was formed to establish standardized international rules and regulations for the skating disciplines it governs, and to organize international competitions in these disciplines. It is now based in Switzerland.

History

The International Skating Union (ISU) was founded in 1892 in the Dutch seaside town of Scheveningen. The meeting was attended by 15 men, as the national association representatives from the Netherlands, Great Britain, Germany/Austria, and two clubs from Stockholm (Sweden) and Budapest (Hungary). 
The ISU was the first international winter sports federation to govern speed skating and figure skating, as it laid down the rules for speed skating, shortly followed by figure skating. In 1895, the organization streamlined its mission to deal only with amateur competitors, not professionals, and hosted its first amateur skating championship in February 1896 in St. Petersburg, Russia.

The United States and Canada formed a competing organization, the International Skating Union of America (ISUA), in 1907. Over the next two years, 12 European nations had joined the ISU, while the ISUA had only its original two members. The ISUA folded in 1927.

European and North American figure skaters rarely competed against each other because of differences in their styles of skating. The ISU had "systematized and arranged" the sport of figure skating, with competitions including "a selection of ten or twelve numbers from the ISU programme, ... five minutes' free skating to music, ... [and] special figures" on one foot. In 1911, Canada joined the ISU, leaving the United States as the only major competitor to not be a member. This changed in 1923, when the United States Figure Skating Association joined the ISU and in 1926, the Japanese sport governing body followed to acquire ISU membership.

The first ISU competitions to emerge were the World and European Speed Skating and Figure Skating Championships. Both disciplines were included in the official program of the first Winter Olympic Games in Chamonix in 1924. The discipline of ice dancing was introduced at the Innsbruck Games in 1976. After 1945, the ISU slowly continued to grow with accession of members from other countries in Europe, Oceania, and (Southern) Africa.

In 1967, the ISU adopted short track speed skating, and the first official ISU World Championships took place in 1981. Short track speed skating became part of the official Olympic program in 1992. The earliest speed skating competitions hosted by the ISU, between 1976 and 1980, were held under different names but have retrospectively received World Championship status. The discipline was known as "indoor speed skating" at first, until being renamed "short track speed skating" when indoor rinks for the longer speed skating events were introduced.

By 1988, 38 nations had joined the ISU. Over the next few years, the organization abandoned one of its long-held practices, eliminating the use of mandatory figures in the singles' figure skating competitions and reducing their use in ice dancing. During the 1970s and 1980s, several Asian countries joined the ISU, followed in the early 1990s by many new countries emerging from the breakup of the USSR, Yugoslavia and Czechoslovakia. In 1994, synchronized skating was formally recognized as a separate discipline, and the first ISU World Championships were held in 2000 in Minneapolis, Minnesota.

After the 2002 Winter Olympics in Salt Lake City, Utah, the ISU implemented changes to many of its events. The ISU approved the use of video replay, when available, to review referee decisions. The rules for judging figure skating were also overhauled as a direct result of the 2002 Olympic Winter Games figure skating scandal. According to Ottavio Cinquanta, former president of the ISU, "'Something was wrong there,' ... 'Not just the individual but also the system. It existed for 70 years. Now we are trying to replace one system with another.'" A new judging system for figure skating took effect in 2005, replacing the 6.0 system of "perfect" scores and instead giving points for various technical elements.

Since the 2000s, the ISU has experienced a new wave of expansion, with several countries in Asia and Latin America joining the organization. In 2019, skating federations from Chile, Peru, Turkmenistan, and Vietnam acquired membership of the ISU.

After the 2022 Russian invasion of Ukraine, the ISU banned all athletes from Russia and Belarus from events until further notice.

ISU Members

Regions
List of 80 Countries (101 Association, Some nations have 2 or 3 organ member) in 5 Zones (Updated at 10 April 2022):

 Four Continents (4C) (non-European countries): 35 Members
 European Countries: 45 Members

Year of Membership

 Africa: 
 - 2022
 - 1938/1938
 - 2011
 Asia: 
 - 2017
 - 1956/1956
 - 1983
 - 2013
 - 2003
 - 1926
 - 1992
 - 2014
 - 1948
 - 2009
 - 1960
 - 2004
 - 1957
 - 2014
 - 2008
 - 1988
 - 2019
 - 1983
 - 2013
 - 1992
 - 2019
 Oceania: 
 - 1932/1957
 - 1964/1983
 Americas: 
 - 2004/2006
 - 2002
 - 1894/1947
 - 2019
 - 2015
 - 2021
 - 1987
 - 2019
 - 1923/1965
 Europe: 
 - 1995
 - 1994
 - 1995
 - 1993
 - 1979/1979
 - 1994
 - 1992
 - 1967
 - 1992
 - 1995
 - 1923/1991
 - 1913
 - 1956
 - 1928
 - 1908/1960
 - 1908
 - 1892
 - 1992
 - 1950/1950
 - 2015
 - 1908
 - 2008
 - 2000
 - 1992
 - 1927
 - 1926
 - 2014
 - 1980/1980
 - 1971/1996
 - 2014
 - 2017
 - 2003
 - 1892
 - 1894
 - 1925/1987
 - 2021
 - 1933
 - 1991/1991
 - 1992
 - 2006
 - 1896/1911
 - 1993/1998
 - 1892/1905/1946
 - 1990
 - 1992/1992

ISU Championships

In addition to sanctioning other international competitions, the ISU designates the following competitions each year as "ISU Championships":

Veteran
 World Veterans Figure Skating Championships
 World Veterans Speed Skating Championships
 World Veterans Short Track Speed Skating Championships

Olympic

The events such as the Olympic Winter Games and the ISU Grand Prix of Figure Skating are not ISU Championships. However, they do count towards Personal Best scores.

ISU Cups and Grand Prixs
 ISU Speed Skating World Cup - 1985
 ISU Short Track Speed Skating World Cup - 1998
 ISU Grand Prix of Figure Skating - 1995
 ISU Junior Grand Prix of Figure Skating - 1997

First world championships

Dates and locations of first world championships in various disciplines held under the auspices of the ISU:
 1893: Speed skating (men only), Amsterdam
 1896: Figure skating (men only), St. Petersburg
 1906: Figure skating (ladies), Davos
 1908: Figure skating (pairs), St. Petersburg
 1936: Speed skating (women), Stockholm
 1952: Figure skating (ice dance), Paris
 1970: Sprint speed skating, West Allis, Wisconsin
 1978: Short track speed skating, Solihull, UK
 2000: Synchronized skating, Minneapolis

Cooperation with other sports
The ISU has an agreement with the Federation of International Bandy to use the same arenas. The cooperation between the two federations is increasing, since both have an interest in more indoor venues with large ice surfaces being built.

Organization

The ISU is an international sport federation recognised by the International Olympic Committee as the body globally administering figure skating and speed skating sports with the following disciplines: Speed skating, Single & Pair skating, Ice dance, Short track speed skating, and Synchronized skating.
Whereas the individual national associations administer these sports at the national level, all international matters are under the sole jurisdiction and control of the ISU.

There was an attempt to set up an alternative association to replace the ISU for governing and promoting figure skating throughout the
world. In March 2003, a group of several former figure skating champions (who at the time were still practicing as coaches, judges, referees) announced the creation of a new international governing body for figure skating, the World Skating Federation ("WSF"). This attempt ultimately failed.

ISU is organized as an association pursuant to Swiss laws (art. 60 of Swiss Civil Code). It has its own legal identity and falls  under the jurisdiction of Switzerland.  Articles of Association define ISU's purpose as

The objectives of the ISU are regulating, governing and promoting the sports of Figure and Speed Skating and their organized development on the basis of friendship and mutual understanding between sportsmen.The ISU shall work for broadening interest in Figure and Speed Skating sports by increasing their popularity, improving their quality and increasing the number of participants throughout the world. The ISU shall ensure that the interests of all ISU Members are observed and respected.

The ISU Statutes consist of the ISU Constitution including its Procedural Provisions, and ISU General Regulations setting out framework principles. More detailed provisions are contained in Special Regulations and Technical Rules for Single & Pair Skating and Ice Dance, Synchronized Skating Speed Skating, and Short Track Speed Skating. 
The ISU Code of Ethics, the ISU Anti-Doping Rules, and ISU Anti-Doping Procedures contain further guidelines.
Additional provisions and updates can also be found in ad-hoc published ISU Communications.

Members

The members of the ISU are the individual national associations whose task is to administer figure and speed skating on ice at the national level. Members are typically composed of skating clubs and athletes are individual members of those clubs. As of 20 February 2020, the International Skating Union counts 98 members.

ISU Congress 

The highest-ranking body of the ISU is the ISU Congress which consists of the ISU Members. The Congress meets once every two years for an ordinary meeting. Ordinary resolutions are passed by a simple majority of votes of the ISU Members represented and voting at a Congress. Proposals require a two-thirds majority of ISU Members in favor in order to be accepted.

Since the ISU's inception in 1892, 58 ordinary meetings in total have been organized.

ISU Council 
The ISU Council constitutes the highest ISU body between two Congresses.
It is the executive body of the ISU and is responsible for determining the policies of the ISU and deciding upon the general coordination of the ISU structure and strategy.  The Council consists of the President, a Vice President, and five members for the Figure Skating Branch and a Vice President, and five members for the Speed Skating Branch.

The Council is assisted by the Director General and the ISU Secretariat. The Director General is responsible for the daily management of all business and financially related activities of the ISU and the operation of the Secretariat.

As of the summer of 2008, the ISU consisted of 63 member nations, with a governing council of 11.  To add any proposal to the agenda of meetings, it must have support from four-fifths of the members.  Proposals on the agenda are approved with a two-thirds majority vote.

Presidents of the ISU 

 1892–1895 , Pim Mulier
 1895–1925 , Viktor Balck
 1925–1937 , Ulrich Salchow
 1937–1945 , Gerrit W. A. van Laer
 1945–1953 , Herbert J. Clarke
 1953–1967 , James Koch
 1967–1967 , Ernst Labin
 1967–1980 , Jacques Favart
 1980–1994 , Olaf Poulsen
 1994–2016 , Ottavio Cinquanta
 2016–2022 , Jan Dijkema
 2022–present , Kim Jae-youl

ISU Commissions and Committees 

Following the ISU Congress 2018, the organizational chart of the ISU includes alongside the ISU Congress and ISU Council, assisted by the ISU Secretariat, the following bodies:
 ISU Disciplinary Commission
 ISU Athletes Commission
 ISU Medical Commission
 ISU Development Commission 
 ISU Technical Committees.

The ISU Disciplinary Commission (DC) constitutes a judicial body of the ISU. It is an independent body elected by the ISU Congress.

The ISU Athletes Commission was introduced on the 56th ISU Ordinary Congress 2016 in Dubrovnik and represents Skaters’ positions within the ISU by providing advice to the ISU Council, Technical Committees, Sports Directors, Director General and other internal bodies.

The ISU Medical Commission coordinates compliance with anti-doping regulations.

The ISU Development Commission implements the ISU Development Program in accordance with the ISU policy and the approved budget.

The main functions of the ISU Technical Committees include the preparation, monitoring and maintenance of the Technical Rules. The following Technical Committees are established: Single and Pair Skating, Ice Dance, Synchronized Skating, Speed Skating and Short Track Speed Skating.

Eligibility rules

ISU's role as an international sports federation involves setting the rules to ensure proper governance of sport, notably in terms of the health and safety of the athletes and the integrity of competitions.
Similar to many international sports federations, ISU adopted eligibility rules. 
Under the ISU eligibility rules, skaters participating in competitions that are not approved by the ISU face severe penalties up to a lifetime ban from all major international skating events.

Historically, only amateurs were allowed to qualify for the Olympic Games and in 1962, the IOC issued the Eligibility rules which specified that persons receiving remuneration and other material advantages for participation in sport were not eligible to compete in
the Olympic Games. However, the concept of amateur sport developed over time, moving by the end of the 1980s towards professionalisation. Respecting the Olympic principles, the ISU rules made a difference in treatment of amateur and professional skaters wishing to qualify for the Olympic Games.  In 1986, the limitations imposed on professional skaters were removed and the categories of "eligible" and "ineligible" persons were introduced to replace the concepts of "amateurs" and "professionals". In 1998, Eligibility rules established a comprehensive pre-authorisation system by stipulating that eligible skaters could only take part in competitions approved by the ISU, and conducted under the ISU Regulations by ISU-approved officials. Under the 2014 Eligibility rules, the person who breached the Eligibility rules could not be reinstated. This resulted in a lifetime ban, since the loss of eligibility is not limited in time.

There were attempts of independent organisers to hold alternative speed skating events.

Icederby International co., Ltd  sought to set up a series of events titled ‘Icederby Grand Prix’ scheduled to run for six consecutive years from 2014–2020. Run by a Korean event organiser, it offered unprecedented prize money to attract the world's best skaters.
In 2011, Icederby International approached the ISU to enter into a partnership agreement and presented its action plan. Initially, Icederby included betting in connection with its planned Grand Prix in countries where betting was not prohibited. In January 2012, the ISU updated its Code of Ethics to rule out the participation in all forms of betting. Two years later, Icederby notified the ISU that no betting would be organised in connection with the planned Dubai Icederby Grand Prix as betting is illegal in Dubai.
Nonetheless, the ISU did not authorise the Dubai Icederby Grand Prix 2014 and announced that all skaters who take part in the Icederby event would be subject to the lifetime ban established by the Eligibility rules. In consequence, Icederby decided not to organise the Dubai Icederby Grand Prix 2014 due to its difficulty to secure the participation of speed skaters.

Two professional speed skaters, Mark Tuitert and Niels Kerstholt,  lodged a complaint and on 5 October 2015, the European Commission initiated formal antitrust proceedings into alleged anti-competitive restrictions imposed by the International Skating Union on athletes and officials' economic activities and alleged foreclosure of competing alternative sport event organisers.

On 20 October 2015, the ISU published the procedure for independent organisers to receive authorisation from the ISU Council. Under the 2016 Eligibility rules, the sanctions imposed on a skater participating in non-authorised events ranged from a warning to periods of ineligibility running from an unspecified minimum to a maximum of a lifetime.

In December 2017, the European Commission decided that  ISU's eligibility rules breach EU competition laws. The Commission gave the ISU 90 days to amend the rules and did not impose a fine.
The ISU disagreed with the decision, suspended the enforcement of the rules subject to the Commission decision, and put in place provisional rules. 
In addition, the ISU filed an appeal against the EU Commission decision pending before the EU General Court.

Commercial aspects

The ISU, as an Olympic Winter Sport Federation, derives its revenues from
 Broadcast partnerships for world-wide media coverage of ISU Events;
 Sponsorship agreements;
 Contributions provided by the IOC for the Winter/ Youth Olympic Games; and
 Interest income earned from the ISU's financial assets.

In 2018, the ISU generated a worldwide consolidated turnover of CHF 35.6 million, as compared to CHF 36.9 million for the financial year 2017. 
 
For the financial year 2018, the operating income for Television ISU Events (net) amounted to around 17 million CHF, and for advertising events (sponsorship agreements) to around 6.9 million CHF.

Whereas the situation regarding TV events appears to be relatively stable, the conclusion of sponsorship agreements becomes more challenging due to a highly competitive market environment. Thus, ISU has been unable to replace the Speed Skating Title Sponsor with a similarly lucrative agreement. Also, as ISU Members in China and the Republic of Korea were, for different reasons, unable to host ISU Short Track Speed Skating Events during the 2018/19 season, the ISU  was also unable to maintain sponsorship agreements in those countries.

As the ISU sport disciplines significantly contribute to the success of the Olympic Winter Games, the ISU can also continue to rely on substantial amounts provided by the IOC. After the successful 2018 Olympic Winter Games (OWG) in South Korea, these incomes have increased as compared to the 2014 OWG in Sochi and are again close to the level of the 2010 OWG of Vancouver.

To ensure a substantial annual interest income independent from commercial partners’ interests, the ISU employs a long-standing conservative investment policy. The interest income on high-rated bonds from Credit Suisse, Banque Cantonale Vaudoise, and UBS accrued at the end of the financial year 2018 amounted to CHF 1.44 million.

In 2020, the ISU launched the ISU Skating Awards

See also 
 International figure skating
 List of international sport federations
 Long track speed skating
 Short track speed skating
 Synchronized skating
 ISU Figure Skating Championships

Notes

References

External links 
 Official website
 ISU Judging System - Official site for ISU's judging system (software and manuals)

 
International sports organizations
IOC-recognised international federations
International sports bodies based in Switzerland
Sports governing bodies in Europe
Ice skating governing bodies
Sports organizations established in 1892
Figure skating organizations
Speed skating